Invacare Corporation is an American manufacturer and distributor of non-acute medical equipment including wheelchairs, mobility scooters, walkers, pressure care and positioning, as well as respiratory products. Headquartered in Elyria, Ohio, the company currently distributes its product to more than 80 countries around the world. In February 2023, Invacare stated that it had filed for Chapter 11 bankruptcy.

History
The history of Invacare can be traced back to 1885 when the Worthington Company began to produce a wide range of wheelchairs. The product lines were expanded several times, but its main focus remained in wheelchairs.

In the 1970s, Invacare was owned by Technicare, a Cleveland medical device manufacturer. With Mal Mixon as its Vice President of Marketing, the company branched into the field of diagnostic imaging. Later in 1978, Technicare was acquired by  Johnson & Johnson who subsequently put Invacare up for sale. Driven by the wish of running his own firm, Mal Mixon expressed interest in buying Invacare. Because of financial constraint, Mixon had to borrow $4.3 million and raise another $2.5 million in order to buy Invacare at $7.8 million. The transaction closed on December 28, 1979.

Today, through numerous acquisitions, Invacare has grown into a $1.8 billion medical product company, supplying over 25,000 medical equipment providers with its product and distributing them to more than 80 countries around the world.

In 2012, Invacare entered into a consent decree with the Federal Government regarding certain products and facilities.

By 2013, the FDA had accepted two certification reports by an independent auditor, making progress toward removing the consent decree. In 2015, after a follow up inspection, the agency informed Invacare that more work was required in both the company’s controls over its design process and design history as outlined in report two.

Although the third party auditor had submitted a third and final certification report whose acceptance could have lifted the consent decree, no review could be done on that report until the discrepancies noted in report two had been resolved.

In April 2017, the agency informed that company that it had accepted the revised second certification report allowing Invacare to resume design work in its Elyria, OH facility. The company is awaiting review and acceptance of the third certification report.

Harvard Alumni Achievement Award
On September 27, 2007, A. Malachi Mixon was conferred the Harvard Business School's highest honor, the Alumni Achievement Award, by Dean Jay O. Light. The award was also given to Ayala Corp. chair Jaime Augusto Zobel de Ayala, Martin Sorrell, Donna Dubinsky and Hansjörg Wyss of Synthes.

References

External links
 

Companies listed on the New York Stock Exchange
Manufacturing companies based in Ohio
Wheelchair manufacturers
Elyria, Ohio
Companies that filed for Chapter 11 bankruptcy in 2023